3rd OTO Awards

Reduta, Bratislava, Slovakia

Overall winner  Soňa Müllerová

Hall of Fame  Ladislav Chudík

◄ 2nd | 4th ►

The 3rd OTO Awards, honoring the best in Slovak popular culture for the year 2002, took time and place on February 1, 2003, at the Reduta concert hall in Bratislava. As with the previous editions of the show, the ceremony broadcast live by STV was hosted by Tibor Hlista.

Presenters

 Manuel Bauer, Allianz representative
 Stano Dančiak, actor
 Dana Herrmannová, TV announcer
 Renáta Klačanská, EuroTelevízia chief editor 
 Peter Kočiš, actor
 Marcela Laiferová, singer
 Josef Laufer, actor-singer
 Zuzana Neubauerová
 Richard Rybníček, STV managing director
 Božidara Turzonovová, actress
 Pavel Zedníček, actor

Performers

 Hex, group
 Jolana Fogašová, opera singer
 Jana Kirschner, singer
 Josef Laufer, singer
 Ivan Tásler, singer
 Linda Vargová, singer
 Lucie Vondráčková, singer

Winners and nominees

Main categories
 Television

 Music

Others

References

External links
 Archive > OTO 2002 – 3rd edition  (Official website)
 OTO 2002 – 3rd edition (Official website - old)

03
2002 in Slovak music
2002 in Slovak television
2002 television awards